The University of Córdoba (UNICORDOBA, sometimes referred to colloquially UNICOR), is a public, departmental, coeducational, research university based in the city of Montería, Córdoba, Colombia. It was founded in 1974 by Elías Bechara Zainúm

See also

 List of universities in Colombia

Notes

External links
 University of Cordoba official site 

Universities and colleges in Colombia
Educational institutions established in 1962